The year 285 (CCLXXXV) was a common year starting on Thursday (link will display the full calendar) of the Julian calendar. In the Roman Empire, it was known as the "Year of the Consulship of Carinus and Aurelius" (or, less frequently, "year 1038 Ab urbe condita"). The denomination 285 for this year has been used since the early medieval period, when the Anno Domini calendar era became the prevalent method in Europe for naming years.

Events 
 By place 
 Roman Empire 
 Spring – Emperor Carinus marches from Britain to northern Italy, and defeats the army of usurper Sabinus Julianus at Verona.
 Summer – Battle of the Margus: Emperor Diocletian defeats the forces of Carinus in the valley of the Margus (Serbia). Numerous soldiers desert Carinus during the battle. Carinus then flees to the Pannonian fort of Cornacum, but he is soon slain by his officers.
 July 21 or July 25 – Diocletian appoints his fellow-officer Maximian to the office of caesar, or junior co-emperor.
 Carausius, naval commander at Bononia (modern-day Boulogne), is given the task of clearing the English Channel of Frankish and Saxon pirates.
 Maximian is sent to pacify Gaul, where the Bagaudae, a band of peasants, are revolting against the Roman Empire.

Births 
St. Sylvester, Italian bishop (d. 335)

Deaths 
 Marcus Aurelius Carinus, Roman consul and emperor
 Du Yu (or Yuankai), Chinese general and politician (b. 222)
 Sabinus Julianus, Roman usurper (approximate date)

References